11th International contest of young performers «New wave» which was held from 24 to 29 July 2012 in the concert hall Dzintari in Jūrmala, Latvia.

Participants

Day 1–25 July

Day 2–26 July

Day 3–28 July

Results

Presenters 
 Valeria Kudryavtseva
 Sergey Lazarev
 Aleksandr Revva
 Vera Brezhneva
 Ivan Dorn
 Anna Semenovich
 Sergey Zverev
 Vladimir Zelenskiy
 Elizaveta Boyarskaya
 Valery Meladze
 Verka Serduchka
 Potap

The contest program 
 24 July — Grandiose gala concert dedicated to the opening of the contest
 25 July — The first day of the contest — The day of the world-wide hit
 26 July — The second day of the contest — The hit of the native country
 27 July — Traditional beach soccer tournament «New Wave Cup» between the teams of show business stars and contestants «New Wave».
 27 July — Creative evening of Konstantin Meladze
 27 July — Night discotheque «Muz-TV» — Special guest — Timati.
 28 July — Tennis tournament between the stars of the «New Wave» and professionals
 28 July — The third day of the contest — Premiere Day — Special guest — Lara Fabian.
 29 July — Gala concert dedicated to the closing of the contest, award ceremony — Special guests — Nelly Furtado and Sumi Jo.

Jury 
 Raimonds Pauls
 Igor Krutoy
 Valeriya
 Laima Vaikule
 Valery Meladze
 Konstantin Meladze
 Igor Nikolayev
 Igor Matviyenko
 Leonid Agutin
 Yuri Antonov
 Maxim Fadeev

References

External links 
 Official website of the «New wave Contest» 
 Official website of the «Junior New wave Contest» 

2012 in music
2012 in Latvia
Music competitions in Latvia